Sandra Faison (born September 16, 1950) is an American actress and singer. She became an acting teacher after her performing career.

Career

Acting 
In 1977, she made her Broadway debut as Grace Farrell, secretary to Daddy Warbucks, in Annie. Additional theatre credits include Charlie and Algernon (1980), Is There Life After High School? (1982), and You Can't Take It with You (1983, replacement Alice Sycamore)

Faison's feature film credits include The Sterile Cuckoo (1969) and All the Right Moves (1983).

On television she was featured in the soap operas The Guiding Light as the original Brandy Shelloe before actress JoBeth Williams took over the role, Another World, and The Edge of Night. She had a recurring role in The Days and Nights of Molly Dodd, a regular role in the first season of Anything but Love, and made guest appearances on Scarecrow and Mrs. King, Quantum Leap, The Wonder Years, Grace Under Fire and Party of Five, among others.

In the television movie An Eight Is Enough Wedding (1989), she played Abby Bradford.

Teaching 
After 13 years, Faison retired from teaching at Fiorello H. LaGuardia High School. where she also served as LaGuardia’s assistant principal of theater for her last five years. , she teaches an annual workshop at London's Royal Academy of Music, is the Artistic Director for the ArtsBridge Summer Musical Theater 2, and teaches the second year acting and music students at the Neighborhood Playhouse School of the Theatre in New York City.

Filmography

Film

Television

References

External links
 
 
 

1949 births
Living people
American musical theatre actresses
American stage actresses
American television actresses
American film actresses
American women singers
20th-century American actresses
American soap opera actresses
Place of birth missing (living people)
21st-century American women